The Horus swift (Apus horus) is a small bird in the swift family. Horus, whose name this bird commemorates, was the ancient Egyptian god of the sun, son of Osiris and Isis.

Description
The Horus swift is 13–15 cm long and quite bulky. It appears entirely blackish except for a white patch on the chin and a white rump. It has a medium length forked tail. It has a fluttering flight like little swift. Little swift has a square tail, and more extensive white on the rump than Horus, and white-rumped swift has a more deeply forked tail and a narrower white band. The call is a buzzing peeeeooo, peeeeooo. The paler subspecies  A. h. fuscobrunneus of southwestern Angola has a small grey throat patch and a brown rump. The form toulsoni of northwestern Angola and Zimbabwe is a dark morph of nominate A. h. horus, with a dark rump and small throat patch. Both dark forms have sometimes been split as separate species.

Distribution and habitat
The swift breeds in sub-Saharan Africa. It has an extensive continuous distribution from eastern and southern South Africa north to southern Zambia and central Mozambique, and has recently colonised the De Hoop Nature Reserve area of the Western Cape. It also occurs very discontinuously in much of the rest of the sub-Saharan region, with the Ethiopian mountains and the area from central  Kenya into Uganda having large populations. Identification difficulties confuse the limits of this species’ range. Birds in South Africa are migratory, wintering further north. Other populations are resident apart from local movements.

Behaviour
The Horus swift breeds in old burrows of bee-eaters, ground woodpeckers, kingfishers and martins, which are typically in natural or artificial sandy banks. The flat nest of vegetation and hair, glued with saliva is built at the end of the tunnel and 1-4 eggs are laid. The eggs are incubated for 28 days to hatching, and the fledging period is about 6 weeks. This species is not colonial, but the nature of its breeding habitat means that a number of pairs may be scattered through a bee-eater or banded martin colony. It feeds at middle levels over adjacent habitats, but avoids large towns.

References 

 Chantler and Driessens, Swifts 
 Sinclair, Hockey and Tarboton, SASOL Birds of Southern Africa,

External links
 Horus swift - Species text in The Atlas of Southern African Birds.

Horus swift
Birds of Sub-Saharan Africa
Birds of Southern Africa
Horus swift
Taxa named by Theodor von Heuglin